Caroline  is a village in central Alberta, Canada. It is located southwest of Red Deer.

The community is named after Caroline Langley, daughter of Mr. and Mrs. Harvey Langley. The family opened the community's original post office in 1908.

Demographics 

In the 2016 Census of Population conducted by Statistics Canada, the Village of Caroline recorded a population of 512 living in 233 of its 259 total private dwellings, a  change from its 2011 population of 501.

Notable people 
Kurt Browning, world champion figure skater
Kris Russell, professional ice hockey player
Ryan Russell, professional ice hockey player
Jim Vandermeer, professional ice hockey player
Pete Vandermeer, former professional ice hockey player

Gas discovery 
In the mid-1980s a large natural gas field valued at 10 billion dollars was discovered nearby. It was named Caroline for the village, and subsequently developed by Shell. The gas is sour with about 35% hydrogen sulfide. In 2019 Shell sold the field and processing plant to Pieridae Energy.

See also 
Caroline Curling Club
List of communities in Alberta
List of villages in Alberta

References

External links 

1951 establishments in Alberta
Villages in Alberta